Winona Lake is a town in Wayne Township, Kosciusko County, in the U.S. state of Indiana, and the major suburb of Warsaw. The population was 4,908 at the 2010 census.

Geography
Winona Lake is located at  (41.220818, -85.817118). It is now contiguous to Warsaw, the two towns having run into each other as they have expanded.

History
Winona Lake is best known for the lake it is named after and built on, although the lake was originally known as Eagle Lake. Located along the eastern shore of the lake, the Winona Lake Historic District includes various historic homes and other buildings that attest to the area's history as a Chautauqua and Bible conference hotspot. It is also the home of Grace College and Grace Theological Seminary and was the home of famed preacher and professional baseball player Billy Sunday who died in 1935. The Billy Sunday Home has been preserved as a museum. Christian musician and preacher Homer Rodeheaver also made Winona Lake his home from 1912 until his death in 1955. The Winona School of Professional Photography was started there in 1912 (as the Indiana School of Photography) and was operated by the Professional Photographers of America (PPA) until its move to Chicago (Mount Prospect) in 1988. Famous photographers from around the world taught there during summer-only classes. The now defunct Winona College was founded here, and the Winona Lake School of Theology was located here from 1920 to 1970. Winona Lake was also home to the headquarters of The Free Methodist Church until it moved its offices to Indianapolis in 1990.

The Winona Lake Historic District was listed on the National Register of Historic Places in 1993.

Demographics

2010 census
At the 2010 census there were 4,908 people, 1,569 households, and 1,098 families living in the town. The racial makup of the town was 92.2% White, 1.5% African American, 0.1% Native American, 1.0% Asian, 4.0% from other races, and 1.2% from two or more races. Hispanic or Latino of any race were 7.4%.

Of the 1,569 households 35.2% had children under the age of 18 living with them, 57.9% were married couples living together, 8.2% had a female householder with no husband present, 4.0% had a male householder with no wife present, and 30.0% were non-families. 25.0% of households were one person and 11.1% were one person aged 65 or older. The average household size was 2.62 and the average family size was 3.13.

The median age in the town was 28.3 years. 23.7% of residents were under the age of 18; 22.3% were between the ages of 18 and 24; 21.3% were from 25 to 44; 19.9% were from 45 to 64; and 12.7% were 65 or older. The gender makeup of the town was 46.6% male and 53.4% female.

2000 census
At the 2000 census there were 3,987 people, 1,371 households, and 972 families living in the town. The racial makup of the town was 91.15% White, 0.75% African American, 0.03% Native American, 0.85% Asian, 0.03% Pacific Islander, 5.74% from other races, and 1.45% from two or more races. Hispanic or Latino of any race were 8.28%.

Of the 1,371 households 39.4% had children under the age of 18 living with them, 58.8% were married couples living together, 8.5% had a female householder with no husband present, and 29.1% were non-families. 23.3% of households were one person and 5.3% were one person aged 65 or older. The average household size was 2.73 and the average family size was 3.25.

The age distribution was 28.8% under the age of 18, 10.2% from 18 to 24, 29.2% from 25 to 44, 18.8% from 45 to 64, and 12.9% 65 or older. The median age was 32 years. For every 100 females, there were 95.6 males. For every 100 females age 18 and over, there were 91.9 males.

The median household income was $42,454 and the median family income  was $50,817. Males had a median income of $35,313 versus $25,769 for females. The per capita income for the town was $19,025. About 3.6% of families and 6.7% of the population were below the poverty line, including 5.3% of those under age 18 and 7.0% of those age 65 or over.

References

External links
 Town of Winona Lake, Indiana website
  The Village at Winona

Towns in Kosciusko County, Indiana
Towns in Indiana